Edward J. Lucyk (born July 29, 1942) is a former Democratic member of the Pennsylvania House of Representatives.

Lucyk graduated from the Mahanoy Area High School in 1960. He graduated from the United States Military Academy in 1964 and earned an M.B.A. degree from George Washington University in 1969. He was first elected to represent the 123rd legislative district in the Pennsylvania House of Representatives in 1980, a position he held until his retirement prior to the 2002 election.

References

External links

1942 births
Living people
People from Mahanoy City, Pennsylvania
Democratic Party members of the Pennsylvania House of Representatives